In probability theory and statistics, the law of the unconscious statistician, or LOTUS, is a theorem which expresses the expected value of a function  of a random variable  in terms of  and the probability distribution of .

The form of the law depends on the type of random variable  in question.

 

 

 

In even greater generality,  could be a random element in any measurable space, in which case the law is given in terms of measure theory and the Lebesgue integral. In this setting, there is no need to restrict the context to probability measures, and the law becomes a general theorem of mathematical analysis on Lebesgue integration relative to a pushforward measure.

Etymology
This proposition is (sometimes) known as the law of the unconscious statistician because of a purported tendency to think of the identity as the very definition of the expected value, rather than (more formally) as a consequence of its true definition. The naming is sometimes attributed to Sheldon Ross' textbook Introduction to Probability Models, although he removed the reference in later editions. Many statistics textbooks do present the result as the definition of expected value.

Joint distributions
A similar property holds for joint distributions, or equivalently, for random vectors. For discrete random variables X and Y, a function of two variables g, and joint probability mass function f(x, y):

 

In the absolutely continuous case, with f(x, y) being the joint probability density function,

Special cases
A number of special cases are given here. In the simplest case, where the random variable  takes on countably many values (so that its distribution is discrete), the proof is particularly simple, and holds without modification if  is a discrete random vector or even a discrete random element.

The case of a continuous random variable is more subtle, since the proof in generality requires subtle forms of the change-of-variables formula for integration. However, in the framework of measure theory, the discrete case generalizes straightforwardly to general (not necessarily discrete) random elements, and the case of a continuous random variable is then a special case by making use of the Radon–Nikodym theorem.

Discrete case
Suppose that  is a random variable which takes on only finitely or countably many different values , with probabilities . Then for any function  of these values, the random variable  has values , although some of these may coincide with each other.

Then according to the definition of expected value of a random variable as a weighted average of possible outputs, there is

But this can be rewritten as

If  takes on only finitely many possible values, the above is fully rigorous. However, if  takes on countably many values, the last equality given does not always hold, as seen by the Riemann series theorem. Because of this, it is necessary to assume the absolute convergence of the sums in question.

Continuous case
Suppose that  is a random variable whose distribution has a continuous density .

In the simplest case, if  is differentiable with nowhere-vanishing derivative, then the above integral can be written as

thereby identifying  as possessing the density .

where the equality follows by another use of the change-of-variables formula for integration.

The result still holds true in these broader settings, although the proof requires more sophisticated results from mathematical analysis such as Sard's theorem and the coarea formula. In even greater generality, using the Lebesgue theory as below, it can be found that the identity

holds true whenever  has a density  (which does not have to be continuous) and whenever  is a measurable function for which  has finite expected value. (Every continuous function is measurable.)

Measure-theoretic formulation
An abstract and general form of the result is available using the framework of measure theory and the Lebesgue integral.
 
(interpreted as saying, in particular, that either side of the equality exists if the other side exists). In fact, the discrete case (although without the restriction to probability measures) is the first step in proving the general measure-theoretic formulation, as the general version follows therefrom by an application of the monotone convergence theorem. Without any major changes, the result can also be formulated in the setting of outer measures.

If  is a σ-finite measure, the theory of the Radon–Nikodym derivative is applicable.

In the further special case that  is the real number line, as in the contexts discussed above, it is natural to take  to be the Lebesgue measure, and this then recovers the 'continuous case' given above whenever  is a probability measure. (In this special case, the condition of σ-finiteness is vacuous, since Lebesgue measure and every probability measure are trivially σ-finite.)

References

 

 

 
 

Theory of probability distributions
Statistical laws